Levin Furniture is a furniture and mattress retailer with 28 stores in Pennsylvania and Ohio.

History
The company was founded in 1920 by Sam and Jessie Levin in Mount Pleasant, Pennsylvania as a general sales clearance center. In the 1940s, the Levin family phased out other items in order to concentrate on furniture.  Leonard Levin, son of Sam and Jessie, joined the company during this time and eventually became president.  Between 1978 and 1985, the company added five new stores in the Pittsburgh, Pennsylvania area.  In 1989, Howard Levin became president following the death of his father Leonard.  In 1992, the company expanded its operations into the Cleveland, Ohio market.  Shortly after, Robert Levin became president of the company.

In 2017, Robert Levin retired and Levin Furniture was acquired by Art Van Furniture of Warren, Michigan.  In 2020, Art Van Furniture filed for Chapter 11 bankruptcy with plans to liquidate all company-owned stores.  Former Levin Furniture owner Robert Levin stepped in soon after and signed a deal to buy back the Levin Furniture stores to save them from potential closures.  In addition to buying back his own stores, Levin also acquired two former Wolf Furniture stores in central Pennsylvania that were impacted by the Art Van bankruptcy.  This brought the total number of Levin stores to 28.

References

External links 
 Levin Furniture

Retail companies established in 1920
Furniture retailers of the United States
1920 establishments in Pennsylvania
Companies that filed for Chapter 11 bankruptcy in 2020